M.E.A.T. is a single released by the US musical group Tomahawk. It is a collection of two previously unreleased tracks from the Oddfellows recording session. It was first released on vinyl format on May 23, 2014 and was released digitally on June 4, 2014.

Track List

Personnel
Tomahawk
Mike Patton – vocals, keyboards
Duane Denison – guitar
Trevor Dunn – bass
John Stanier – drums, percussion

Additional
Danielle de Picciotto – cover, design

References

2014 singles
Ipecac Recordings singles
2014 songs
Tomahawk (band) songs